Mullick, Mulick or Mulik is a surname. Notable people with the surname include:

Amar Mullick (1899–1972), Indian actor and director
Basanta Mullick (1868–1931), Indian civil servant and judge
Jagdish Tukaram Mulik, Indian politician and member of the Bharatiya Janata Party
Jyotipriyo Mullick, Indian politician of West Bengal
Kanchan Mullick, Bengali film and television actor
Koel Mallick (born 1982), Indian film actress who appears in Bengali films
Kumud Ranjan Mullick (1883–1970), Bengali writer and poet
Milind Mulick, Indian watercolour painter, teacher and author
Mukunda Behari Mullick (1888–1974), Indian lawyer, reformer, professor, politician
Mushaal Mullick, wife of separatist leader Yasin Malik who advocates separation of Kashmir from India
Nirvan Mullick (born 1975), Los Angeles-based filmmaker, writer, speaker, animator, founder of the Imagination Foundation
Nodu Mullick, sitar maker from India
Pankaj Kumar Mullick, (1905–1978), Indian Bengali music director, pioneer of film music in Bengali cinema and Hindi cinema
Prafulla Mullick (1919–1974), Indian swimmer
Pratap Mullick, Indian illustrator who worked for the Indian comic book series Amar Chitra Katha
Pravanjan Mullick (born 1976), Indian first class cricketer for Odisha
Rajendra Mullick (1819–1887), Indian art lover and philanthropist
Ranjit Mallick (born 1944), Indian actor who works mainly in Bengali cinema
Robert Mulick (born 1979), Canadian former professional ice hockey defenceman
Shujaul Mulik, elected to represent Kunar Province in Afghanistan's Wolesi Jirga in 2005
SP Mullick, Indian cricketer, played 33 first-class matches between 1960 and 1971 for Kerala
Subodh Chandra Mullick (1879–1920), Bengali Indian industrialist, philanthropist and nationalist
Surabuddin Mullick, Indian footballer who is currently playing for Mohun Bagan in the I-League as a Midfielder

See also
Raja SC Mullick Road traverses mainly through Jadavpur and then the inner parts of south Kolkata and ends at Garia, where it meets the Netaji Subash Chandra Bose Road
Mullica (disambiguation)
Mulock (disambiguation)
Mulliken (disambiguation)